Ron Bickley (21 October 1926 – 11 October 2020) was an Australian rules footballer who played with Fitzroy in the Victorian Football League (VFL).

Notes

External links 		
		
		
		
		
2020 deaths		
1926 births		
Australian rules footballers from Victoria (Australia)		
Fitzroy Football Club players
University Blacks Football Club players